Kumzari is a Southwestern Iranian language that is similar to the Persian, Achomi and Luri languages. Although vulnerable, it survives today with between 4,000 and 5,000 speakers. It is spoken by Kumzaris on the Kumzar coast of Musandam Peninsula, northern Oman.  This is the only Iranian language spoken exclusively in the Arabian Peninsula. Kumzaris can also be found in the towns of Dibba and Khasab as well as various villages, and on Larak Island. The speakers are descendants of fishermen who inhabited the coast of the Persian Gulf and the Gulf of Oman.

Location
The Kumzari name derives from the historically rich mountainous village of Kumzar. The language has two main groups of speakers, one on each side of the Strait of Hormuz: by the Shihuh tribe of the Musandam Peninsula and by the Laraki community of Larak Island in Iran. On the Musandam Peninsula, the Kumzar population is concentrated in Oman, in the village of Kumzar and in a quarter of Khasab known as the Harat al-Kumzari. In addition, Kumzari is found at Dibba and the coastal villages of Elphinstone and the Malcolm Inlets. It is the mother tongue of fishermen who are descendants of the Yemeni conqueror of Oman, Malek bin Faham. Based on linguistic evidence, the presence of Kumzari in the Arabia region exists prior to the Muslim conquest of the region in the 7th Century A.D.

Phonology

Consonants 
Kumzari has consonants, and all but three also exist as geminates

Vowels 
Kumzari has a length distinction in its vowels, with five long vowels and three short vowels.

References

External links
Kumzar's Last Stand
Rare language also under threat in Straits of Hormuz
Traditional Marriage in Oman: Kumzari Traditional Marriage

Further reading

External links
 http://www.endangeredlanguages.com/lang/zum
 Audio presentation on Kumzari oral traditions

Languages of Oman
Languages of Iran
Languages of the United Arab Emirates
Endangered Indo-European languages
Southwestern Iranian languages
Musandam Governorate